Skaptopara Cove is a 2 km wide cove indenting for 900 m the north coast of Greenwich Island in the South Shetland Islands, Antarctica east of Aprilov Point and west of Terimer Point. Situated northeast of Sevtopolis Peak, southeast of Ongley Island and northwest of Mount Plymouth.  Shape enhanced as a result of Teteven Glacier’s retreat in the late 20th and early 21st century.

The cove is named after the ancient Thracian town of Skaptopara, ancestor of the present Bulgarian city of Blagoevgrad.

Location

Maps
 L.L. Ivanov et al. Antarctica: Livingston Island and Greenwich Island, South Shetland Islands. Scale 1:100000 topographic map. Sofia: Antarctic Place-names Commission of Bulgaria, 2005.
 L.L. Ivanov. Antarctica: Livingston Island and Greenwich, Robert, Snow and Smith Islands. Scale 1:120000 topographic map.  Troyan: Manfred Wörner Foundation, 2009.  
 L.L. Ivanov. Antarctica: Livingston Island and Smith Island. Scale 1:100000 topographic map. Manfred Wörner Foundation, 2017.

References
 Skaptopara Cove. SCAR Composite Gazetteer of Antarctica
 Bulgarian Antarctic Gazetteer. Antarctic Place-names Commission. (details in Bulgarian, basic data in English)

External links
 Skaptopara Cove. Copernix satellite image

Coves of Greenwich Island